Trevor Preece (13 October 1882 – 21 September 1965) was a Welsh cricketer. He was a right-handed batsman and right-arm off-break bowler who played for Glamorgan. He was born in Cowbridge and died in Whitchurch, Cardiff.

Preece, who played cricket and hockey for Cardiff, Barry, and St. Fagan's, made his Minor Counties Cricket debut for Glamorgan during the 1902 season, though it would be a further 21 years before he made his only first-class appearance, during the 1923 season, against Lancashire. He scored 4 runs in each innings in which he batted.

Preece's son, Hugh, played Minor Counties Cricket for Glamorgan Second XI.

References

External links
 Trevor Preece at Cricket Archive

1882 births
1965 deaths
Welsh cricketers
Glamorgan cricketers
People from Cowbridge
Cricketers from the Vale of Glamorgan